Akka Chellelu is a 1970 Indian Telugu-language drama film, produced by V. B. Rajendra Prasad and directed by A. Sanjeevi. It stars Akkineni Nageswara Rao, Sowcar Janaki, Krishna and Vijaya Nirmala, with music composed by K. V. Mahadevan. The film was a remake of the Tamil film Akka Thangai (1969).

Plot
Justice Ramachandra Rao belongs to a highly reputed family, lives along with his mother Shantamma and younger brother Venu a law student. On the other side, Janaki an illiterate innocent woman whose life ambition is to make her younger sister Vijaya as an advocate to serve the truth. Fortunately, Venu and Vijaya are classmates and love birds. Once Ramachandra Rao sees Janaki and likes her. Thereafter, Janaki crosses many hurdles, toils hard and successfully establishes Vijaya as a lawyer. Soon after, Dharmayya trustworthy person of Ramachandra Rao also well-wisher of Janaki fixes their alliance. Knowing it, Venu and Vijaya are felt with joy and moves for a ride where Vijaya witnesses a person slaughtering a girl Shobha. During the time of Janaki's marriage, Vijaya identifies Ramachandra Rao as the murderer and pleads Janaki to stop the marriage. Venu overhears, argues that her allegation is false and challenges to prove his brother is not guilty. Nevertheless, Janaki marries Ramachandra Rao and the couple leads a happy marital life. Right now, Dharmayya's son Bhanu is indicted in the crime, Vijaya takes up the case even Janaki also blesses her to stand for piety. In the court, Vijaya declares Ramachandra Rao as the culprit which creates a high turmoil and Ramachandra Rao is arrested. The case goes into sessions where Venu appears in the favor of Ramachandra Rao and both Venu and Vijaya give a tough fight.

Meanwhile, Ramachandra Rao is set free on bail and tries to escape when Janaki, Shantamma and Vijaya obstructs his way but he casts them. Here Venu spots confirm him as Ramachandra Rao identical person and chases. By the time, original Ramachandra Rao reaches home everyone accuses him as criminal and gives a statement in the court. Devastated Ramachandra Rao also affirms himself as guilty. At that point in time, Venu arrives along with the real offender Raju when Shantamma realizes him as Ramachandra Rao's twin brother and starts narrating the past. Years ago, Ramachandra Rao's father who is also a judge given the death sentence to a criminal to take avenge his father Papaiah stolen one of the children and reared him as a criminal. Knowing it, Raju repents and admits his crime. At last, Ramachandra Rao is acquitted, Raju has given a short-term penalty and Vijaya pleads for a pardon from everyone. Finally, the movie ends on a happy note with the marriage of Venu and Vijaya.

Cast

Soundtrack

Music composed by K. V. Mahadevan. Music released on Audio Company.

References

External links
 

1970 films
Indian black-and-white films
Films scored by K. V. Mahadevan
Indian drama films
Telugu remakes of Tamil films
1970s Telugu-language films
1970 drama films